Vosso is a river in Voss municipality in Hordaland, Norway. The river starts at Tvildemoen, Vossevangen, where the two rivers Strandaelvi and Raundalselvi meet. The river continues through the Vangsvatnet and Evangervatnet before ending in the Bolstadfjord at Bolstadøyri. Between Evangervatnet and the Bolstadfjorden the river is also called Bolstadelvi. In 1986 the river was protected from water power development through "Verneplan III for vassdrag".

References 

Rivers of Vestland
Voss